The AsiaWorld–Expo is one of the two major convention and exhibition facilities in Hong Kong along with Hong Kong Convention and Exhibition Centre. It was opened on 21 December 2005 by Donald Tsang, the second Chief Executive of Hong Kong, and it is operated by AsiaWorld–Expo Management Limited. It is located on Chek Lap Kok island, next to the Hong Kong International Airport.

History
The complex was built under a public–private partnership involving the Hong Kong government, landowner Airport Authority Hong Kong, and a consortium led by private company Dragages et Travaux Publics. The name of the new centre, AsiaWorld–Expo, was announced on 27 November 2003, and is intended to reflect Hong Kong's "Asia's World City" promotional brand, which was launched in 2001.

A groundbreaking ceremony was held on 29 March 2004. The new facility opened on 21 December 2005.

During the COVID-19 pandemic, AsiaWorld–Expo was used as a Department of Health saliva collection and testing centre for those arriving at Hong Kong International Airport. Starting in January 2022, it has been used as a treatment facility for patients with mild cases of COVID-19.

In May 2022, Irene Chan Fong-ying, chief executive of AsiaWorld-Expo, said the first phase of the facility will have upgraded facilities and smart sanitizing equipment such as UV lights costing HK$600 million while a new 30,000 square meter second phase will have 20,000 seats.

Features
At a construction cost of HK$2.35 billion, AsiaWorld–Expo has over 70,000 square metres of space with 10 ground-level and column-free halls, including the AsiaWorld–Arena – the biggest purpose-built indoor seated entertainment arena in Hong Kong with a maximum capacity of 14,000; the AsiaWorld–Summit – Hong Kong's largest indoor conference venue that seats 700 to 5,000 persons; the Runway 11 – the venue's latest conference and function hall for 500 to 3,800 guests.

AsiaWorld–Expo is also an award-winning venue. In 2017, the arena is awarded the "Best International Venue" at the Exhibition News Awards.

Venues 
 The Arena (Hall 1)
 AsiaWorld-Summit (Hall 2)
 Typical Halls (Halls 3–11)
 VIVA (Halls 8 & 10)
 Runway 11 (Hall 11)
 Meeting & Hospitality Centre

Transport 
AsiaWorld–Expo is next to the airport; visitors can walk to the venue in a short distance. The venue is next to the AsiaWorld–Expo station, on the Airport Express of the Hong Kong MTR. Buses and coach from Mainland China are also available.

Most road signs directing to AsiaWorld–Expo simply refer to the venue as "Expo".

Exhibitions and events

The halls of AsiaWorld–Expo, mainly AsiaWorld–Arena, AsiaWorld-Summit, and VIVA, have been used for various entertainment events. They have staged concerts by acts such as Oasis, Michael Bublé, Eric Clapton, Il Divo, Coldplay, David Guetta, Madonna, Britney Spears, Kylie Minogue, Alicia Keys, Björk, Avril Lavigne, Bruno Mars, One Direction, Lady Gaga, Taylor Swift, Justin Bieber, Jennifer Lopez, Maroon 5, Lily Allen, Ariana Grande, Westlife, Christina Aguilera, Plácido Domingo, Ayumi Hamasaki, Deep Purple, Green Day, Wonder Girls, Girls' Generation, L'Arc-en-Ciel, Namie Amuro, Stone Roses, Super Junior, Macklemore & Ryan Lewis, Imagine Dragons, X Japan, Smashing Pumpkins, Big Bang, 2NE1, G-Dragon, JYJ, Exo, BTS, GOT7, Monsta X, 5 Seconds of Summer, Katy Perry, Metallica, Jessie J, Shane Filan of Westlife, Guns N' Roses, Above & Beyond, Blackpink, Treasure and many more.

Since 2013, it has hosted the Mnet Asian Music Awards. It has also hosted exhibition such as ITU Telecom World 2006, Asian Aerospace, and E-Commerce Asia.

Footnotes 

Convention and exhibition centres in Hong Kong
Chek Lap Kok
2005 establishments in Hong Kong
Hong Kong International Airport
Music venues completed in 2005
Music venues in Hong Kong